Veliš is a municipality and village in Jičín District in the Hradec Králové Region of the Czech Republic. It has about 200 inhabitants.

Administrative parts
The village of Vesec is an administrative part of Veliš.

Notable people
Karel Pařík (1857–1942), architect

References

Villages in Jičín District